Barlee may refer to:

 Lake Barlee, an intermittent salt lake in Western Australia
 Bill Barlee (1932–2012), Canadian politician and television historian storyteller
 Frederick Barlee (1827–1884), Australian politician, Lieutenant-Governor of British Honduras (now Belize), and Administrator of Trinidad
 John Buckle Barlee (1831–1870), English rower